Champaksak Sangha College or CSC (Lao: ວິທະຍາໄລົສົງຄ໌ຈຳປາສັກ) is the second Buddhist College in Laos.

The Champasak Sangha College currently offers only B.A Programs . There are three faculties which have organized into several academic units: Faculty of Buddhist Studies, Faculty of Lao, and Faculty of English.

Education in Laos
Educational organizations based in Laos
Buddhist universities and colleges